Jonah Holmes (born 24 July 1992 in Stockport, England) is a rugby union winger who currently plays for Ealing Trailfinders in the RFU Championship and former player for .

Early life 

Holmes was born in Stockport, England. He played junior rugby for London Scottish until the age of 16 but then left to only play with his school St Benedict's School, Ealing where he was considered a star in the making.

Professional career 
Holmes initially played scrum half but during a loan spell with Henley Hawks he switched to the back three playing wing and full back.  At the suggestion of Lyn Jones, who was his coach during a brief spell at London Welsh, he concentrated solely on the back three.

In 2013 Holmes joined Leeds Carnegie, since renamed Yorkshire Carnegie, on loan from London Wasps.  Holmes scored six tries in his first six games for the Yorkshire side.  Holmes made the move permanent in the summer, as part of a swap deal with Glyn Hughes.  On 23 December 2013, after scoring 22 tries in 34 games, signed a new long term deal with Yorkshire.

On 1 June 2017 it was announced that Holmes would join Leicester Tigers for the 2017–18 season. Holmes scored 10 tries in 11 games during the 2017/18 season and provided a Man of the Match performance against Northampton Saints at Twickenham in October 2018, he was called up to the  squad on 16 October 2018. He qualifies through his grandparents. Holmes left Leicester at the end of the 2019–20 season, a year before his contract was due to end to join the Dragons, in Wales. On 20 September 2020, Holmes made his debut against Bristol Bears in a Challenge Cup quarter final defeat.

International tries

Personal life

Holmes is the nephew of Olympic-gold medal winning rower Andy Holmes and is a graduate in Biomedical sciences from Birkbeck, University of London.

References

1992 births
Living people
Dragons RFC players
English rugby union players
Leeds Tykes players
Leicester Tigers players
London Welsh RFC players
Rosslyn Park F.C. players
Rugby union players from Stockport
Rugby union wings
Wales international rugby union players
Wasps RFC players
Welsh rugby union players